Swimming at the 2011 Pacific Games in Nouméa was dominated by the host team New Caledonia who won thirty-three of the forty events contested. The events in the pool – nineteen each for men and women – were held between 29 August and 2 September at the Verlaguet Aquatic Center. The men's and women's open water events were held on Monday 5 September in the waters off Ouvéa Naval Base. All pool events were swum in a long-course (50 metre) pool and the open water events were 5 kilometres in length.

Event schedule
Note: Below are the events by days. Event order presumably was alternate women / men.

Monday, September 5: Men's and Women's 5K Open Water swim.

Medal summary
New Caledonia's Lara Grangeon entered all twenty women's events and won a medal in all of them, including sixteen golds. Host country New Caledonia won the gold medal in all women's events.

Medal table

Men

Women

Participating countries
88 swimmers from 11 countries were entered in the swimming events at the 2011 Games. The teams entered in swimming were:

 (1)
 (11)
 (9)
 (3)
 Micronesia (3)
 (36)
 (6)
 (12)
 (3)
 (1)
 (3)

References

Sources

External links
 
Swimming at the 2011 Pacific Games
Results on the French Swimming Federation website.

2011 Pacific Games
Pacific Games
2011